Catherine Connolly (born 12 July 1957) is an Irish Independent politician who has served as the Leas-Cheann Comhairle of Dáil Éireann since July 2020. She has been a Teachta Dála (TD) for the Galway West constituency since 2016. She previously served as Chair of the Committee on the Irish Language, the Gaeltacht and the Islands from 2016 to 2020 and Mayor of Galway from 2004 to 2005.

Connolly is a patron of the People's Movement.

Political career

Local politics
Connolly was first elected to Galway City Council in the city west local electoral area in June 1999 and then re-elected in the city south local electoral area in 2004.

In the same year she was elected Mayor of Galway.

She resigned from the Labour Party in 2006, when she was denied her wish to run alongside now-President Michael D. Higgins in Galway West. She contested the 2007 general election, polling just over 2,000 votes.

Her sister, Colette, currently a Galway City Councillor, was co-opted to replace her on Galway City Council when she was elected a TD.

National politics
She contested the 2011 general election again in Galway West, where she lost out on the last seat to Fine Gael's Seán Kyne by only 17 votes. She sought a full recount, which concluded after a total of four days of counting but did not change the outcome.

She was elected to the Dáil for the Galway West constituency at the 2016 general election.

She voted for Richard Boyd Barrett for Taoiseach, when the 32nd Dáil first met.

At the 32nd Dáil's second meeting on 5 April 2016, she made her maiden speech in which she criticised the Minister for the Environment, Community and Local Government Alan Kelly's handling of Ireland's homelessness crisis.

Connolly sat on the Public Accounts Committee and was Chair of the Committee on the Irish Language, the Gaeltacht and the Islands.

Catherine Connolly contested the 2020 general election. She was re-elected on the 12th count.

Election as Leas-Cheann Comhairle of Dáil Éireann
Connolly was elected the Leas-Cheann Comhairle of Dáil Éireann on 23 July 2020, in a shock victory over Fine Gael candidate Fergus O'Dowd and is the first woman to hold the position.

Mother and Baby Homes Report
In January 2021, Connolly criticised the Government for their handling of the Final Report of the Commission of Investigation (Mother and Baby Homes and certain related matters).

Referring to the Taoiseach, Tánaiste and Minister for Children, Equality, Disablity, Integration and Youth as the "three unwise men",  she was critical of the Government's failure to provide survivors of mother and baby homes the report before it was released to the general public. Connolly stated "This document I have to hand is what the report looks like. I hold it up to show survivors because they do not have it. It is the executive summary with the recommendations and one or two other things. Not a single survivor has it. I have it since yesterday, when it was put in the pigeonholes of Deputies."

Personal life
Originally from Shantalla, Connolly has lived in the Claddagh since 1988, and is married with two children. A barrister by profession, she also previously worked as a Clinical Psychologist, with the Western Health Board in Ballinasloe, Galway and Connemara. She is a Gaeilgeoir (someone who speaks fluent Irish).

References

External links
 Andrews, Kernan. "Connolly raises doubts over independence of crypto report", Galway Advertiser, 6 November 2008.

1957 births
Living people
Independent TDs
Labour Party (Ireland) politicians
Mayors of Galway
Members of the 32nd Dáil
Members of the 33rd Dáil
Politicians from County Galway
Alumni of Trinity College Dublin
Alumni of the University of Galway
Local councillors in Galway (city)
21st-century women Teachtaí Dála